The Franklin O-405 (company designation 6AC-403) was an American air-cooled aircraft engine of the 1940s. The engine was of six-cylinder, horizontally-opposed layout and displaced . The O-405-9 (6ACV-403) was a vertically mounted, fan cooled version for helicopters.

Variants
6AC-403 (XO-405-1) at 2,750 rpm

6ACSA-403 (XO-405-3)Supercharged,  at 2,750 rpm

6ACGSA-403 (O-405-5) Supercharged, geared propeller drive at 0.632:1.  at 3,200 rpm

6ACV-403 (O-405-9)Vertically mounted, fan-cooled helicopter version,  at 3,275 rpm

Applications
Culver XPQ-15
Doman LZ-1A 
Doman Pelican
Fairchild XUC-86B
Fleetwings XBQ-1
Kellett XR-8
Sikorsky R-6

Specifications (6AC-403/XO-405-1)

See also

References

Notes

Bibliography

 Gunston, Bill. (1986) World Encyclopedia of Aero Engines. Patrick Stephens: Wellingborough. p. 57

Franklin aircraft engines
1940s aircraft piston engines
Boxer engines